Ruben F. Salazar Park (formerly Laguna Park) is a park in East Los Angeles, Los Angeles County, California.

It is administrated by the Los Angeles County Department of Parks and Recreation.

It was renamed "Salazar Park" in honor of slain journalist Rubén Salazar, who was killed nearby in 1970.

References

Parks in Los Angeles County, California
Eastside Los Angeles